Pierce County is a county in the U.S. state of Nebraska. As of the 2010 United States Census, the population was 7,266. Its county seat is Pierce. The county was formed in 1859, and was named for US President Franklin Pierce.

Pierce County is part of the Norfolk, NE Micropolitan Statistical Area.

In the Nebraska license plate system, Pierce County is represented by the prefix 40 (it had the 40th-largest number of vehicles registered in the county when the license plate system was established in 1922).

Geography
The Pierce County terrain consists of low rolling hills, sloping to the east and southeast. The north fork of the Elkhorn River flows southeastward through the central part of the county, while Dry Fork drains the lower western part, then discharges into the north fork of the Elkhorn. Most of the county's area is devoted to agriculture, often under central pivot irrigation.

Major highways
  U.S. Highway 20
  U.S. Highway 81
  Nebraska Highway 13
  Nebraska Highway 98
  Nebraska Highway 121

Adjacent counties

 Cedar County – northeast
 Wayne County – east
 Stanton County – southeast
 Madison County – south
 Antelope County – west
 Knox County – north

Protected areas
 Willow Creek Recreation Area

Demographics

As of the 2000 United States Census, there were 7,857 people, 2,979 households, and 2,141 families in the county. The population density was 14 people per square mile (5/km2). There were 3,247 housing units at an average density of 6 per square mile (2/km2). The racial makeup of the county was 98.65% White, 0.08% Black or African American, 0.36% Native American, 0.20% Asian, 0.03% Pacific Islander, 0.23% from other races, and 0.46% from two or more races. 0.71% of the population were Hispanic or Latino of any race.

There were 2,979 households, out of which 35.30% had children under the age of 18 living with them, 63.40% were married couples living together, 5.70% had a female householder with no husband present, and 28.10% were non-families. 25.70% of all households were made up of individuals, and 13.70% had someone living alone who was 65 years of age or older. The average household size was 2.59 and the average family size was 3.14.

The county population contained 29.00% under the age of 18, 7.00% from 18 to 24, 26.00% from 25 to 44, 20.90% from 45 to 64, and 17.20% who were 65 years of age or older. The median age was 38 years. For every 100 females, there were 100.00 males. For every 100 females age 18 and over, there were 95.10 males.

The median income for a household in the county was $32,239, and the median income for a family was $40,500. Males had a median income of $26,563 versus $20,237 for females. The per capita income for the county was $15,980. About 8.80% of families and 11.80% of the population were below the poverty line, including 14.20% of those under age 18 and 12.90% of those age 65 or over.

Communities

Cities
 Osmond
 Pierce (county seat)
 Plainview

Villages
 Foster
 Hadar
 McLean

Unincorporated communities
 Breslau
 Wee Town

Politics
Pierce County voters have been reliably Republican for decades. In no national election since 1936 has the county selected the Democratic Party candidate (as of 2020).

See also
 National Register of Historic Places listings in Pierce County, Nebraska

References

 
Norfolk Micropolitan Statistical Area
1859 establishments in Nebraska Territory
Populated places established in 1859